The 1935 European Rugby League Championship was a rugby league international competition held in 1935.  The 1935 edition was the first ever held.

Results

Final standings

 England win the tournament on points difference.

References

European Nations Cup
European rugby league championship
International rugby league competitions hosted by the United Kingdom
International rugby league competitions hosted by France
1935 in Welsh sport
1935 in English sport
1935 in French sport